Purantand is a village in Lalganj Block, Vaishali district in the Indian state of Bihar. 

It is situated 8 km away from sub-district headquarter Lalganj and 28 km away from district headquarter Hajipur. As per 2009 stats, Purantand is the gram panchayat of Purantand  village. Purantand has a total population of 1000 peoples. There are about 110 houses in Purantand village. Bhagwanpur station is nearest railway station to Purantand  which is approximately 5 km away.

Villages in Vaishali district